Teoc Creek is a stream in the U.S. states of Alabama and Mississippi. It is a tributary to the Sucarnoochee River.

Teoc is a name derived from the Choctaw language meaning "pine". Variant names are "Teah Creek", "Teark Creek", "Teock Creek", "Teoe Creek", and "Tioch Creek".

References

Rivers of Alabama
Rivers of Sumter County, Alabama
Rivers of Mississippi
Rivers of Kemper County, Mississippi
Alabama placenames of Native American origin
Mississippi placenames of Native American origin